Blenda Maria Ljungberg (7 December 1907, Enköping - 27 November 1994, Uppsala), was a Swedish politician (Moderate Party).

Ljungberg was a teacher. She was a member of the Uppsala City Council 1943, and also the first female chairperson of a Swedish City Council in 1959-63. She became an MP in the Upper Chamber in 1962-64, the Lower Chamber in 1965-70, and the new unicameral Riksdag 1971 for Uppsala.

References
Tidens kalender 1971, almanack och uppslagsbok. Stockholm: Tidens förlag, 1970, sid. 232. 
 https://web.archive.org/web/20160304040030/http://www.nebeta.se/encyklopedi/l%C3%A5ng/blenda-ljungberg
 https://web.archive.org/web/20111118033300/http://www.moderatakvinnorshistoria.se/Media/MKH_1a_arsmote.pdf

1907 births
1994 deaths
Members of the Riksdag
Women members of the Riksdag
People from Uppsala Municipality
People from Enköping Municipality
20th-century Swedish politicians
20th-century Swedish women politicians